Hariton Peak is the rocky peak rising to 1690 m near the north end of Sentinel Range in Ellsworth Mountains, Antarctica.  It is named after Pop (Priest) Hariton (Hariton Halachev, 1835–1876), a leader of the 1876 April Uprising for Bulgarian independence.

Location
US mapping in 1961.

See also
 Mountains in Antarctica

Maps
 Newcomer Glacier.  Scale 1:250 000 topographic map.  Reston, Virginia: US Geological Survey, 1961.
 Antarctic Digital Database (ADD). Scale 1:250000 topographic map of Antarctica. Scientific Committee on Antarctic Research (SCAR). Since 1993, regularly updated.

Notes

References
 Hariton Peak. SCAR Composite Gazetteer of Antarctica.
 Bulgarian Antarctic Gazetteer. Antarctic Place-names Commission. (details in Bulgarian, basic data in English)

External links
 Hariton Peak. Copernix satellite image

Ellsworth Mountains
Bulgaria and the Antarctic
Mountains of Ellsworth Land